Amerijet International operates freight services to the following international scheduled destinations (as of April 2022):

References

Lists of airline destinations